William Gillies (1865–1932) was a Scottish politician and co-founder of the National Party of Scotland .

William Gillies may also refer to:

William Gillies (Australian politician) (1868–1928), Premier of Queensland in 1925
William Gillies (sport shooter) (1914–1986), Scottish shooter who represented Hong Kong at the Olympics
William George Gillies (1898–1973), Scottish landscape and still life painter
William S. Gillies (1911–2000), United States artist 
William King Gillies (1875–1952), Scottish educator and academic author.

See also
William Gilly, biologist
William Gillis (disambiguation)